Giza Studio Masterpiece Blend 2001 is the first greatest hits album by Giza Studio recording label. It was released on 19 December 2001. The album features list of songs from voting inquiry by listeners.

In 2010, after fraud scandal with Azumi Uehara is nowadays album out of print.

Charting
The album debuted at #13 on the Oricon Weekly Albums Chart, selling more than 100,000 copies in first week.

Track list

References

2001 compilation albums
Japanese-language compilation albums
Being Inc. compilation albums